Fujuriphyes is a genus of kinorhynchs within the family Pycnophyidae, with 9 species currently assigned to the genus.

Species 

 Fujuriphyes dagon 
 Fujuriphyes dalii 
 Fujuriphyes deirophorus 
 Fujuriphyes distentus 
 Fujuriphyes hydra 
 Fujuriphyes longispinosus 
 Fujuriphyes ponticus 
 Fujuriphyes rugosus 
 Fujuriphyes viserioni

References 

Kinorhyncha